is a group of hot springs in the east of Ibusuki, Kagoshima in Japan, which includes Surigahama Onsen, Yajigayu Onsen, and Nigatsuden Onsen.

2,850,000 people visited in 2003, and 910,000 people stayed there.

90% of the water is used for industry.

Access
It takes about an hour from Kagoshima-Chūō Station by train, and about one hour and thirty-five minutes by non-stop bus.

Water quality
There are about 500 places operating as spring sources. The total amount discharged is about 120,000 tonnes per day.

The water contains mostly sodium. It is a chloride spring but the concentration of salt and minor components differ by region or depth of excavation.

The temperature of discharge is about 50 to 60 degrees, but there is one which is near 100 degrees.

The source of water is a mixture of rain water from Ikeda Lake and Unagi Pond and sea water from Kagoshima Bay.

History
From about 1919 to 1955, the amounts of hot water taken rose to use the heat in agriculture and salt production. Many problems happened; for example, the depletion of the old source of the springs and a decrease in temperature. Because of this, a new source of hot springs was searched for and in 1957, a new layer of hot springs was found in 200 to 300 m below ground and was started for use.

Since 1964 using hot springs for salt production has been banned; however, using them for agriculture and aqua farming of fish has continued.

Other hot springs

Yajigayu Onsen
Yajigayu Onsen is north of Ibusuki Station.
It is said that its name is derived from that of Yaji who discovered this hot spring. Yajigayu Onsen is used in the cultivation of household foliage plants.

Nigatsuden Onsen
Nigatsuden Onsen is weak acid and it is west of Nigatsuden Station.
In 1831, Narioki Shimadzu, lord of Kagoshima, moved his manor house from Surigahama and this hot spring was called the Lord’s Hot Spring (Tonosama-yu).

Surigahama Onsen
Surigahama Onsen is at a road along the coast southeast of Ibusuki Station. It is said that its name is derived from this place was called Sunabagahama.（lit. beach of sand pool）

Suna-mushi Sand Hot Spring
Suna-mushi is a kind of bathing. First bathers put on a yukata. They are covered with sand and steamed by sands, which is agitated to be a moderate temperature. It is difficult to bath alone, so staff are on hand to shovel sand over bathers. Draping a towel around the head is advised to keep sand from sticking to it.

Since 1982, the city has held the annual Ibusuki Onsen Marathon (after 1984, the name was changed to Ibusuki Nanohana Marathon) on the second Sunday of January and more than 10,000 people take part in it every year.

References
 Ibusuki City Hall. Office Administration Division. City Guide Magazine. Mayor Higo Norimasa, 1985,
 Ibusuki City Guide　(Journal version). Mayor Tahara Sako, 2005,
 Kurokawa Susumu　(Paperback) Kagoshima.　Spring Garden Church Publishing, 1997,

External links
 Ibusuki tourism net 

Ibusuki, Kagoshima
Hot springs of Japan
Spa towns in Japan
Tourist attractions in Kagoshima Prefecture
Landforms of Kagoshima Prefecture